Alexander (Sasha) Vladimirovich Vovin (27 January 1961 – 8 April 2022) was a Soviet-born Russian-American linguist and philologist, and director of studies at the School for Advanced Studies in the Social Sciences (EHESS) in Paris, France. He was a world-renowned linguist, well known for his research on East Asian languages.

Education
Alexander Vovin earned his M.A. in structural and applied linguistics from the Saint Petersburg State University in 1983, and his Ph.D. in historical Japanese linguistics and premodern Japanese literature from the same university in 1987, with a doctoral dissertation on the Hamamatsu Chūnagon Monogatari (ca. 1056).

Career
After serving as a Junior Researcher at the St. Petersburg Institute of Oriental Studies (1987–1990), he moved to the United States where he held positions as assistant professor of Japanese at the University of Michigan (1990–1994), assistant professor at Miami University (1994–1995), and assistant professor and then associate professor at the University of Hawai'i (1995–2003). He was appointed full professor at the University of Hawai'i in 2003, and continued working there until 2014. He was visiting professor at the International Research Center for Japanese Studies, Kyoto in 2001-2002 and again in 2008, a visiting professor at the Ruhr University Bochum, Germany (2008–2009), and a visiting professor at the National Institute for Japanese Language and Linguistics (NINJAL) in Tokyo, Japan in May–August 2012.

In 2014 Vovin accepted the position of Director of Studies at the Centre de recherches linguistiques sur l'Asie orientale (CRLAO) unit of the EHESS, where he remained until his death in 2022.

Alexander Vovin specialized in Japanese historical linguistics (with emphasis on etymology, morphology, and phonology), and Japanese philology of the Nara period (710–792), and to a lesser extent of the Heian period (792–1192). His last project before his death involved the complete academic translation into English of the Man'yōshū (ca. 759), the earliest and the largest premodern Japanese poetic anthology, alongside the critical edition of the original text and commentaries. He also researched the moribund Ainu language in northern Japan, and worked on Inner Asian languages and Kra–Dai languages, especially those preserved only in Chinese transcription, as well as on Old and Middle Korean texts.

His last work, published in 2021, is on the Bussokuseki no Uta of Yakushi-ji temple in Nara. In the same year, a festschrift was dedicated to Vovin on his 60th birthday.

Personal life
Vovin died on 8 April 2022, at the age of 61, due to cancer.

Publications
 
 Vovin, Alexander. (2000). Did the Xiong-nu speak a Yeniseian language?. Central Asiatic Journal, 44(1), 87–104. .
 Vovin, Alexander. (2001). Japanese, Korean and Tungusic. Evidence for genetic relationship from verbal morphology. David B. Honey and David C. Wright (eds.), 183–202.
 
 
 Vovin, Alexander. (2003). Once again on lenition in Middle Korean. Korean Studies, 27, 85–107. .
 
 
 
 , 20 volumes
 
 Vovin, Alexander. (2011). Why Japonic is not demonstrably related to 'Altaic' or Korean. In Historical Linguistics in the Asia-Pacific region and the position of Japanese, The International Conference on Historical Linguistics (ICHL) XX.
 Vovin, Alexander. & McCraw, D. (2011). Old Turkic Kinship Terms in Early Middle Chinese. Türk Dili Araştırmaları Yıllığı Belleten, 59(1), 105–116.
 Vovin, Alexander. (2017). Koreanic loanwords in Khitan and their importance in the decipherment of the latter. Acta Orientalia Academiae Scientiarum Hungaricae, 70(2), 207–215.

References

External links
 
 

1961 births
2022 deaths
Russian emigrants to the United States
Russian Japanologists
American Japanologists
Japanese literature academics
Miami University faculty
University of Michigan faculty
University of Hawaiʻi faculty
Paleolinguists
Linguists of Puyŏ languages
Linguists of Ainu
Linguists of Yeniseian languages
Linguists of Xiongnu
Historical linguists
Linguists of Japanese
Linguists of Korean
Academics from Saint Petersburg